Karattuppatti is a village in the Manapparai taluk, Tiruchirappalli district in the Indian state of Tamil Nadu

References

External links
 Karattuppatti Village Location in Wikimpia

Villages in Tiruchirappalli district